Luna-C (born Christopher Howell, 1 May 1973) is a British DJ and record producer, known for his work in breakbeat hardcore music. He was a member of the group Smart E's in 1992, who scored a  2 hit on the UK Singles Chart with "Sesame's Treet" which samples the Sesame Street theme song. He founded Kniteforce Records in 1992, for which he produced tracks and remixes under various aliases. The label was sold in 1997 but resurrected as Kniteforce Again (KFA) in 2001.

Early life
One of Christopher Howell's first passions in life was skateboarding. As a youngster, he was a junior champion in a major competition, and he continued to skate as a hobby for many years after.

On an early school report, his music teacher said that he had no ear for music and that his exam result of 13% reflected this. He was a huge fan of hip-hop music and DJ'd in his spare time well before he experienced the UK rave scene and hardcore music. In fact, he has said that he and his friends ridiculed hardcore music when they first heard it, especially as much of it sampled hip-hop and sped it up. He was persuaded however to go to the hardcore club Labyrinth in 1990, and it changed his view of the music and the scene forever. He soon began buying hardcore music in Music Power Records in Ilford, London, and Boogie Times in Romford. It was here that he met fellow record buyer Tom Orton, who he also worked with in a supermarket. Tom DJ'd as "Mr. Tom" and helped run a weeknight rave called "Ultimatum". Chris began DJing alongside Tom at these raves, and the two of them continued to buy records together in Boogie Times.

Boogie Times Records also had its own record label, Suburban Base, and after talking to the shop owners, Chris and Tom decided to make a record, purely for fun. Tom had a friend, Nick Arnold who had his own studio and had some experience in music production. The three of them decided on the name Smart E's and set about making a tune.

Career

Smart E's
Smart E's released its first single in 1992 on Boogie Times Records. It was called "Bogus Adventure" and was a simple hardcore track that featured samples from the film Bill and Ted's Excellent Adventure. It only sold a few hundred copies, which wasn't unusual for the first release on a small hardcore imprint. The group then produced a track sampling the theme song from Sesame Street entitled "Sesame's Treet". By this time, the Boogie Times Records label was no longer in business, so this track appeared on parent label Suburban Base Records. A number of promos were pressed and interest in the record skyrocketed. Steve Jackson hosted a house music show on London radio station Kiss FM, and began playing the record every day. Suburban Base and Smart E's saw an opportunity and realised that the record had the potential to be a big seller. They drafted Jackson to do a remix for the main release of the record. The record was being played at raves and on pirate radio stations (which were the main channel for hardcore music), and demand saw the number of copies requested by the distributor climb from 1,000 to 10,000 to 50,000. When the record was released it reached  2 on the UK singles chart, which at the time was the highest debut single entry ever.

The success of "Sesame's Treet" brought media attention to Howell and Smart E's. Many dance music magazines panned the trio as either a joke or opportunists trying to cash in on the rave scene. The first and second records were novelty records of sorts. "Sesame's Treet" was picked up for worldwide distribution and Smart E's signed with Pyrotech/Big Beat/Atlantic Records. They toured the United States, doing 29 live PAs in 32 days. Howell felt that the group was ripped off by many people during this time, and although Smart E's produced one album for Atlantic Records, he did not feel that he could continue working under the Smart E's name.

Kniteforce Records
To have more control over his music, Howell bought a studio and founded Kniteforce Records. The label's first release, The Luna-C Project 1 – Edge of Madness, was produced by Luna-C but engineered by Austin Reynolds at Suburban Base Records as Howell hadn't learned how to record. The second release, The Luna-C Project 2 – Mission of Madness, was entirely produced by Luna-C in his studio.

1992–1995
Kniteforce continued to release records which sold well in Germany and the UK. A good release would sell 5,000 copies and a hit would sell much more. Rebecca Try designed all of the label's logos, artwork and covers. Many of the tracks were played by DJs in the scene at the time. Howell produced tracks under the aliases Luna-C and Cru-L-T, and as part of the groups Future Primitive and The Trip. He took engineering duties on all Kniteforce releases, until artists DJ Force & The Evolution and DJ Ham presented ready-for-release tracks to Howell. During this period Luna-C very rarely performed DJ shows.

In 1995 Howell formed Remix Records with hardcore DJ Jimmy J, who owned a shop of the same name in Camden, London. The label and the shop shared the same logo, and the shop became a front for the Kniteforce label.

Under the name Cru-L-T, Howell produced Remix Records tracks with Jimmy J. They found success with the tracks "Take Me Away" and "Six Days", which sampled house tracks but reworked the vocals with piano riffs. "Six Days" sold well in Australia, and Howell and Jimmy J travelled there to DJ and perform live PAs to promote the record.

Rise and fall
Kniteforce records were not selling in the numbers Howell had anticipated. To bring more sales to the label, he commissioned a series of remixes from big-name DJs including Slipmatt, Sy, Vibes and Ramos.

Hardcore changed in 1995 with heavily distorted kick drum riding over the well-established breakbeats. Some of Luna-C's productions mirrored this to keep up with the sound, and in 1996 he set up Malice Records to cater to the hard-edged gabber sound that was being mixed with UK happy hardcore. The first release on Malice Records sold very well, but later releases underperformed in sales.

Howell started a sublabel called Knitebreed, intended for up-and-coming producers, but was unimpressed with the material submitted. He ended up using the label to release tracks from his various aliases. By this time Howell was recording under the names The Timespan, Eko, Garion Fey and DJ Psycangle, and as part of 2 Croozin and 2 Xperience, as well as the usual Luna-C and Cru-L-T monikers. This gave the label the appearance of having a larger roster of artists while allowing Howell greater anonymity.

As Luna-C, Howell had a unique sound he was passionate about, but these tracks weren't selling well and he became disenchanted with the hardcore scene in general. He got into trance music and started an unsuccessful trance label called Strange Room. Facing financial difficulties, Howell halted production on the label and lost interest in making music altogether. DJ Brisk, who had released tunes on Remix Records, formed Next Generation Records with Kniteforce stalwart DJ Ham; DJ Force & The Evolution started UK Dance and split into the two duos DJ Force & Styles and New Motion. Howell found himself in debt for taxes, and in 1997 was forced to sell Kniteforce Records.

Howell sold Kniteforce Records to Death Becomes Me, Ltd., which owned Rogue Trooper, Happy Trax, Punisher and a few other labels. He continued to engineer for the label, and produce tunes under yet more guises, but Kniteforce stopped releasing at number 60. Remix Records stopped its first run under Luna-C's direction, but the name was bought up by another company that released records under the same name and logo. That company in turn sold it on, and the label has continued in one form or another, on and off for years, but no longer has any association with Jimmy J & Cru-L-T.

After the label was sold, and as Luna-C started to recover his financial footing, he married a Japanese woman and began DJing in Japan during 1998. He forged a set that included custom-made dubplates that he created. This was Luna-C's first sign that he was edging back into the hardcore scene. He released a couple of tracks under the Keep It Fresh label, which were old style breakbeat hardcore, but these sold under 500 copies. Luna-C later divorced and cleared his debts in 1999.

Influential Records and Dyne
After losing interest in the hardcore scene, Luna-C became aware of a drum and bass tune called "Tower Bass" by DJ Aphrodite. It was the first tune that had inspired him in a long time. Using Aphrodite's style as a template, Luna-C started Influential Records. He had once produced a jungle-style tune on a one-off release on JFK Recordings as Hired Gun; under a variety of different names again, Howell started to release tunes on the Influential imprint. These began as collaborations with DJ Influence. A couple of the Influential tunes were released under the Infiltration Records banner, which was resurrected in 2001. Influential Records had pushed the Jump-Up style of drum and bass, and as that style faded from popularity in 1999 he started the Dyne label for a darker style of drum and bass.

Knite Force Again (KFA)
Luna-C had requests for represses of the Kniteforce back catalogue, but the original plates had all been destroyed when the vinyl pressing plant the label used went bankrupt. In 2001 he decided to release a record on a new label called KFA Recordings, which was essentially a new style hardcore remix of both "Six Days" and "Take Me Away" by Jimmy J & Cru-L-T. As Luna-C no longer owned the rights to those names, he renamed them "Sicks Daze" and "Hand of Destiny".

Around this time DJ Deluxe, a longtime Kniteforce fan, approached Luna-C about creating an official Kniteforce Records website. The website was launched and became the hub of all Kniteforce-related activity, including a forum where a small community of hardcore Kniteforce fans formed.

Luna-C released KFA's second single, Luna-C Projects 8 & 9, and then brought many of Kniteforce's original artists back to release new material. KFA reintroduced the breakbeat sound to a hardcore scene, which at the time was dominated by the trance-influenced freeform style. KFA releases sold quickly and on 10 May 2002, Luna-C bought back the Kniteforce Records label, all its subsidiaries, and all the rights to the music and the logos (with the exception of the Remix Records logo, which had been sold along with the shop in Camden). This created a lot of excitement, especially on the Internet.

"Supasets"
In 2002 Luna-C began a world tour as a DJ. KFA continued to do well, and Luna-C released tunes as Cru-L-T and The Timespan, and The Luna-C Project X (11 Reasons Why) in October. By 2003 he split his time between managing the label and DJing at raves in the United States, Canada, Australia, New Zealand, and Europe. In addition to releasing records on KFA, demand for his remixes increased, with his remix of DJ Skywalker's "Killerwhale" a notable example from 2003. In October 2003, he released the album 11 Reasons More, which covered a wide range of hardcore music styles and experimented in hardcore production. He began DJing a planned set, the "Supaset", which incorporated every style of hardcore music and varied in tempo throughout with the aid of Luna-C's self-produced "DJ Toolz". In April 2004, Luna-C released "My Angel" along with a special video produced for the tune on DVD. The single gained wider play than anything previously on KFA and received positive reviews in UK dance music magazines.

After the success of the first "Supaset", which was recorded and released as a free download on the Kniteforce Records website, Luna-C released a follow up, and then after touring that set for a number of months, a third. The sets were popular among followers of hardcore music, and Luna-C's released material displayed a harder edge and skipped wildly between breakbeats and gabber. German producer Panacea started to release material on KFA in 2003, and his influence on Luna-C's direction in production was evident on 2004's "Victory", a split single with Panacea's "Winter Mute". October 2004 also saw Luna-C's first venture into event promotion when Kniteforce's 12th birthday party was held at the Electrowerkz in London.

By 2005 sales of KFA records had started to wane. Luna-C had already established an online Kniteforce store after its previous outlet closed down, and much of Kniteforce's revenue had actually started to come from merchandise sold on the site.

Luna-C saw an opportunity to collaborate with some of the other like-minded small hardcore labels that had emerged since Kniteforce's return to the picture and formed All-4-1, a collective of labels that shared a similar philosophy on how to continue to push hardcore music forward. The Kniteforce web shop morphed into the All-4-1 site, which also became the main outlet for the other labels. The entire back catalogue of Kniteforce and its related labels and releases became available through a "create your own CD" feature on the site.

Vinyl is better?
At the beginning of 2006, Luna-C announced that it was unlikely there would be any further KFA releases on vinyl due to rising costs and relatively poor sales. Although there was still a dedicated following to KFA, Luna-C said that it wasn't enough to pay the bills. However, soon after this he announced his intention to change direction in producing and to go back to old skool style breakbeat hardcore. This was met with a mixed response, but when some new productions were previewed on the Internet, feedback was very positive. Howell stated that he would continue to release vinyl as long as he possibly could, and would produce both old skool style breakbeat hardcore and the new style he has been pioneering.

In May 2006, KFA put out two more vinyl releases, one of which was a Luna-C in a breakbeat hardcore style. These releases coincided with a new KFA CD album of unmixed tracks. May also saw the release of the awaited "Luna-C FM" set. This was sent to all buyers of an executive edition of a previous KFA vinyl release, along with a DVD that featured the mix with visuals created by KFA to go along with the music. The mix was then released as a free download. It blends commercial pop music with Luna-C's own brand of breakbeat hardcore, drum and bass and gabber, and plays in the style of a live radio show.

Luna-C announced plans to close the "create your own CD" service at the KFA shop on the All-4-1 website and replace it with an mp3 store selling high bitrate mp3s of Kniteforce music.

After being introduced to the band Keane by a mutual acquaintance, Luna-C was asked to do an official remix of one of their songs. He remixed "A Bad Dream" in two separate versions.

Personal life

On 11 June 2006, Luna-C married fellow KFA artist Bexxie. In early 2014, it was revealed they had divorced.

Subsequently, in December 2015, Luna-C announced he was engaged to his long-time girlfriend, Cindy Carter, and expecting a baby in Spring 2016. Wilder Read Howell was born 30 March 2016, and a few months later, on 24 September 2016, Luna-C married Cindy (Carter) Howell. On 19 September 2017, Luna-C and Cindy announced the birth of their second son, Phoenix Read Howell.

References

Other sources
 Green, Thomas H: "Nightmare on Sesame Street", DJ Magazine, Issue 154, p. 7–20, December 1995

External links
 Kniteforcerevolution – Official Kniteforce Website. 
 HappyHardcore.com – Extensive Luna-C discography

1973 births
Living people
DJs from London
Breakbeat hardcore musicians
English dance musicians
English record producers
Hardcore techno musicians
People from Isleworth
Electronic dance music DJs